Autism is a peer-reviewed academic journal covering research on autism. It is published eight times a year by SAGE Publications in association with the National Autistic Society and was established in 1997. The cover originally contained a puzzle piece, but this was removed in 2018 after the journal decided that it evoked a negative public perception.

Editors-in-chief
The following persons are or have been editor-in-chief: 
  Rita Jordan (University of Birmingham, 1997–2006)
 Patricia Howlin (Institute of Psychiatry, 1997–2007)
 Dermot M. Bowler (City, University of London, 2006-2012)
 David Mandell (University of Pennsylvania School of Medicine, 2012–2022)
 Sue Fletcher-Watson (University of Edinburgh, 2022–present)

Abstracting and indexing
The journal is abstracted and indexed in:

According to the Journal Citation Reports, the journal has a 2021 impact factor of 6.684.

References

External links
 

Psychiatry journals
Works about autism
Publications established in 1997
SAGE Publishing academic journals
English-language journals
8 times per year journals